George Kollias (Greek: Γιώργος Κόλλιας; born 9 November 1958 in Athens) is a Greek biologist, Member of the Academy of Athens and Professor of Physiology at the Medical School of the National and Kapodistrian University of Athens. He is renowned for providing the preclinical rationale for the development of anti-TNF therapies for rheumatoid arthritis. His research is highly cited for discovering disease pathways in animal models of chronic inflammation and autoimmunity (e.g. rheumatoid arthritis, inflammatory bowel disease and multiple sclerosis). He is credited with the development of major national infrastructures of scientific and technological excellence in Greece.

Education and employment 
George Kollias graduated from the Biology Department of the University of Athens, Greece and performed doctoral studies in Molecular Biology from 1980 to 1984 at the National Hellenic Research Foundation. He continued with postdoctoral research in the field of gene structure and expression at the Laboratory of Gene Structure and Expression, National Institute for Medical Research, Mill Hill, London, UK, and from 1990 to 2000 he established the Laboratory of Molecular Genetics at the Hellenic Pasteur Institute in Athens, Greece. From 2000 to 2002, he was appointed Director of the Institute for Immunology at the Biomedical Sciences Research Center "Alexander Fleming", and has served as the center's President and Scientific Director (2002–2010 & 2016–2020). Since May 2012, he is Professor of Experimental Physiology at the Medical School of the University of Athens.

Research and innovation 
In 1991, George Kollias' group was first to provide in vivo, proof of principle studies, on deregulated TNF production being causal to the development of chronic polyarthritis in a transgenic animal model, and for showing originally that anti-huTNF antibody treatment was efficacious in treating the modeled disease (pg. 370). These studies were instrumental in mobilizing the interest of anti-TNF industry and foreshadowed the success of the first clinical trials performed in RA in 1994. Further work in his lab provided insights into the function of TNF in host defense and the structure and function of secondary lymphoid organs, a work that more recently evolved into the establishment of TNFRI and NFkB signals specifically in follicular dendritic cells (FDCs) being of pivotal significance in the regulation of humoral B cell responses and autoimmunity. Moreover, George Kollias' group demonstrated TNF's causal effect in the development of combined Crohn's disease and polyarthritis, and the contribution of transmembrane versus soluble TNF in the pathogenic processes. These studies offered a better understanding of the physiological function of TNF in health and disease and rationalized potential complications or optimizations of anti-TNF therapies in other diseases such as in MS. More recently, George Kollias introduced a novel pathogenic principle to explain the cellular basis of TNF function in gut/joint axis diseases, including spondyloarthropathies, by showing that mesenchymal cells, namely synovial fibroblasts and intestinal subepithelial myofibroblasts, are common pathogenic targets of TNF sufficient to drive the chronic inflammatory and destructive disease process. Animal models developed in his lab have been distributed to numerous academic and industrial laboratories around the world (over 200 MTAs in the last ten years). In 2005 he founded the first CRO-biotech spin-off of BSRC Fleming, Biomedcode Hellas SA.

Distinctions 
George Kollias is placed amongst the top cited European scientists in Rheumatology research for the period 1997 to 2008. He has published over 170 primary research articles in peer-reviewed journals and more than 40 reviews and commentaries. His work has received over 29.000 citations and an h-index of 76 (data from Google Scholar). His laboratory is supported by several competitive grants from European Commission and National sources, as well as by the international biopharmaceutical industry. From 2005 - 2009 Dr. Kollias coordinated a consortium of 24 EU organizations constituting the FP6 Network of Excellence MUGEN ("Functional Genomics in mutant mouse models as tools to investigate the complexity of human immunological disease", 11M€). He is currently a core member of the Innovative Medicines Initiative (IMI) project BeTheCure (Total budget: 38 M€, 2011–2016) and has recently been awarded a 2013 Advanced ERC grant to study the role of mesenchymal cells in intestinal tissue homeostasis and pathophysiology.

George Kollias is an elected member of the European Molecular Biology Organization (EMBO) since 2000 and Member of the Biosciences Steering Group of the European Academies Science Advisory Panel (EASAC) since 2014. In recognition of eminent scientific discoveries and contributions to science, he was awarded the internationally acclaimed Carol-Nachman Award for Rheumatology in 2014 and the first Galien Scientific Research Award, of Prix Galien Greece in 2015. Dr. Kollias served as the National Representative of Greece for the ESFRI (2010-2012) and as member of the ESFRI strategic working group on Health and Food (2010 to date). George Kollias has been a member of the National Council on Research and Technology of the Ministry of Development (2001–2003 and 2005–2009) and has served as an elected President of the Council of the Directors of the Greek Research Centers (2009–2010). He serves as an advisor for scientific organizations and consults for industry. George Kollias also serves as invited speaker, chairman and member of the Organising and Scientific Committees of several scientific meetings throughout the world. George Kollias is Director of the Graduate Program in "Molecular Biomedicine" at the Medical School of the University of Athens.

References

External links 
 BSRC "Alexander Fleming"
 MUGEN Network of Excellence
 BeTheCure IMI project
 Biomedcode Hellas SA
 Advanced ERC grant

Greek physiologists
Greek healthcare managers
Greek biologists
Living people
1958 births
European Research Council grantees
Members of the Academy of Athens (modern)
National and Kapodistrian University of Athens alumni
Academic staff of the National and Kapodistrian University of Athens
Scientists from Athens